El Tablón is a town and municipality in the Nariño Department, Colombia. 
Travelers visit the town for its "mystical stone statues" from the pre-Columbian era  and other archaeological sites (e.g., ancient rock carvings), go rock climbing, and do horseback riding. Climbers in the region get a good view of the Juanambú river canyon.

References

Municipalities of Nariño Department